The Brantford Bandits are a Canadian junior ice hockey team based in Brantford, Ontario, Canada.  They play in the Mid-Western Conference of the Greater Ontario Junior Hockey League.

History

For years, the Brantford Eagles franchise were not very successful.  From 1992 until 2002, the Eagles were only able to surpass ten wins once.  Most of that time, the team had been transplanted to Ohsweken, Ontario.  In 2002, the team moved back to Brantford and began winning more consistently.  By the 2005-06 season, the Eagles made the Mid-Western League final.  In 2007, the three Ontario Hockey Association Junior B Leagues merged into the GOJHL.  From that point on, the Eagles would win three Mid-Western regular season championships, three Mid-Western Conference playoff championships, and the 2009 Sutherland Cup as Ontario Champions.  But the fans did not come.  On May 23, 2012, the Eagles were official moved to Caledonia, Ontario and became the Caledonia Corvairs.

In 2012, the GOJHL announced it was recruiting new teams for a new Toronto-based fourth conference for the league.  In Spring 2013, the plan would unceremoniously die, but a Brantford group that had decided to apply for entry transferred their request to the Mid-Western Conference.  Their request was accepted and the ownership group named themselves the 99'ers in honour of Wayne Gretzky and the Brantford Minor Hockey Association.

On September 6, 2013, the 99ers played their first ever game, on the road, against the Brampton Bombers.  Luc Hartholt scored the first goal in franchise history at 2:29 of the first period in a 4-3 win.  Andre Keire made 20 saves to pick up the first ever win in net.

Season-by-season results

References

External links
Bandits Webpage 
GOJHL Webpage

Ice hockey teams in Ontario
2012 establishments in Ontario